Nixa is a city in Christian County, Missouri, United States. As of the 2020 census, the city's population was 23,257. It is a principal city, and the second largest city in the Springfield, Missouri Metropolitan Statistical Area.

History 
The area was first settled by farmers who located their farms along the wooded streams near present-day Nixa. The area became a crossroads, as it was a half-day ride with a team of horses from Springfield. Teamsters found it a convenient stopover site when hauling freight between Springfield and Arkansas. The village became known as Faughts. An early resident, Nicholas A. Inman, was a blacksmith from Tennessee, who set up a shop in 1852. When a post office was opened, a town meeting was held to decide on a name for the new community. Because of his years of service to the community, the town was suggested to be named for him. Another suggestion was "nix" because the community was "nothing but a crossroads". The name Nix was finally decided upon, and Inman's middle initial "a" was added to get the unique name of Nixa. The village incorporated on June 10, 1902.

Geography
Nixa is located at  (37.045253, -93.298755). The modern city rests on and around seven hills.

Demographics

2000 census
As of the US Census of 2000,  12,124 people, 4,654 households, and 3,448 families resided in the city. The population density was 1,969.1 people per square mile (759.9/km). The 4,962 housing units averaged 805.9 per square mile (311.0/km). The racial makeup of the city was 97.43% White, 0.46% African American, 0.36% Native American, 0.43% Asian, 0.02% Pacific Islander, 0.30% from other races, and 1.01% from two or more races. Hispanics or Latinos of any race were 1.26% of the population.

Of the 4,654 households, 40.4% had children under the age of 18 living with them, 58.3% were married couples living together, 12.4% had a female householder with no husband present, and 25.9% were not families. About 20.7% of all households were made up of individuals, and 7.6% had someone living alone who was 65 years of age or older. The average household size was 2.56 and the average family size was 2.95.

In the city, the population was distributed as 28.4% under the age of 18, 8.5% from 18 to 24, 34.5% from 25 to 44, 17.2% from 45 to 64, and 11.4% who were 65 years of age or older. The median age was 32 years. For every 100 females, there were 89.2 males. For every 100 females age 18 and over, there were 84.9 males.

The median income for a household in the city was $37,655, and for a family was $44,556. Males had a median income of $33,636 versus $21,737 for females. The per capita income for the city was $17,774. About 8.1% of families and 9.7% of the population were below the poverty line, including 14.3% of those under age 18 and 6.7% of those age 65 or over.

2010 census
As of the census of 2010,  19,022 people, 7,264 households, and 5,280 families lived in the city. The racial makeup of the city was 94.4% White, 0.9% African American, 0.7% Native American, 0.8% Asian, 0.1% Pacific Islander, 0.9% from other races, and 2.2% from two or more races. Hispanics or Latinos of any race were 3.1% of the population.

Of the 7,264 households, 41.6% had children under the age of 18 living with them, 56.0% were married couples living together, 12.6% had a female householder with no husband present, 4.0% had a male householder with no wife present, and 27.3% were not families. About 22.8% of all households were made up of individuals, and 8.9% had someone living alone who was 65 years of age or older. The average household size was 2.59 and the average family size was 3.03.

The median age in the city was 34.2 years; 28.8% of residents were under the age of 18; 7.2% were between the ages of 18 and 24; 30.4% were from 25 to 44; 21.2% were from 45 to 64; and 12.3% were 65 years of age or older. The gender makeup of the city was 47.4% male and 52.6% female.

Education 
Nixa Public Schools operates four elementary schools for students in kindergarten through fourth grade: Helen-Matthews Elementary, Espy Elementary, Century Elementary, and the newest, High Pointe Elementary (named because it sits on the highest elevation in Christian County), opened in August 2007. Two intermediate schools serve students in the fifth and sixth grades: Inman Intermediate and Summit Intermediate. One junior high school, Nixa Junior High, and one high school, Nixa Public High School are in the district. A magnet school, John Thomas School of Discovery, hosts kindergarten through sixth grade.
Ozarks Technical Community college Richwood Valley Campus is in the Nixa zip code.

Infrastructure 
The city of Nixa began construction on the largest solar farm in Missouri in June 2017, which was completed and operational in November 2017. The solar farm has 33,288 solar panels located on 72-acres and provides an estimated 9% of the city's power needs. Former Sen. Jay Wasson owns the land on which the solar farm is being built. The farm has a life expectancy of 25 years.

Economy
Nixa is home to Accurate Plastics, as well as another plastic service located adjacent to Accurate Plastics named Diversified Plastics.
Nixa is home to a train part manufacturer, Snyders Equipment Company, division of New York Air Brake.
Also hailing from the community, Aire-Master, a deodorizer brand that specializes in commercial applications, such as restroom air freshener dispensers.

In 2011, B&B Theatres built a cinema between Ozark and Nixa along Route 14.

Nixa has a bowling alley named Century Lanes.

Politics
Nixa is part of Missouri's 7th congressional district.

A petition was submitted in June 2021 to set a recall election for Mayor Brian Steele. The Christian County clerk certified enough valid signatures to trigger the recall election on Nov 2 2021. The petition claims Steele should be recalled for abuse of emergency powers by enacting a mandatory mask mandate and other restrictions during the COVID-19 pandemic, which have since expired. The vote failed, with 75% of the vote going to in favor of Steele.

Annual Sucker Day 
Finis Gold, mayor of Nixa, a  barber and local American Legion commander, started the annual Nixa Sucker Day in 1957. It has been a longstanding tradition. Locals often close up shop or skip school for the day to go "grabbin’ for suckers". The fish are then frozen until enough available for a big fish fry.

The event is held annually during May. It is a family-friendly event held on Nixa's Main Street, with live entertainment and local crafts. Sucker fish and other kinds of food are sold by vendors. Proceeds from Sucker Day activities help fund local causes such as scholarships for graduates from Nixa High School, Project Graduation, and Nixa JROTC.

Notable people
 William F. Austin: CEO of Starkey Hearing Technologies
 Dean Deetz: Professional baseball pitcher
 Courtney Frerichs: American middle-distance runner, and Olympian.
 Jim Kreider: served as Speaker of the Missouri House of Representatives
 Mickey Owen: Professional baseball player and coach

 Chase Allen Tight End in the NFL

In popular culture
In the Robert Ludlum novels and films (fiction), Nixa is the birthplace of Jason Bourne/David Webb.  The Bourne Supremacy revealed that Bourne's real name was David Webb and that he was born in Nixa, Missouri.

Several streets in a residential neighborhood northeast of downtown are named for performers on ABC-TV's Ozark Jubilee, including Nixa native Slim Wilson. They include Slim Wilson Boulevard, Red Foley Court, Zed Tennis Street, Bill Ring Court, (Speedy) Haworth Court and Ozark Jubilee Drive. M

A 2013 episode of the Investigation Discovery television series Beauty Queen Murder featured a murder in Nixa. The 1985 death of Jackie Johns was not solved until 2010, when DNA evidence proved that fellow Nixa resident Gerald Carnahan had raped and murdered the young woman.

Radio Stations
 KGBX-FM

References

External links
City of Nixa
Nixa Area Chamber of Commerce
Nixa XPress newspaper

Cities in Christian County, Missouri
Springfield metropolitan area, Missouri
Cities in Missouri